Brian W. Casey is the current President of Colgate University.

Casey is the former President of DePauw University. He graduated from the Christian Brothers Academy in Lincroft, New Jersey. He later earned his undergraduate degree in philosophy and economics from the University of Notre Dame, where he was invited to join Phi Beta Kappa and was also a member of the varsity swim team.

He earned his J.D. from Stanford University Law School in 1988, and practiced law at the Wall Street law firm Davis Polk & Wardwell before continuing on to Harvard University to obtain his PhD. He was Associate Dean for Academic Affairs at Harvard before joining DePauw in 2008.

Third-Century Plan 
The Third-Century Plan is a strategic framework designed to focus Colgate on the attainment of a series of long-term goals. It also sets forth specific one to three-year steps to begin meeting its ambitious long-term aims. It is designed to significantly strengthen Colgate — academically, financially, and reputationally. Unveiled in the summer of 2019, the plan is broken down into four main sections: Attracting and Supporting Outstanding Students and Faculty; Strengthening the University’s Academic Enterprise; Enriching the Student Experience; and Improving the Campus and the Environment.

References

External links
Office of the President
Tribute Video, May 2016
TV Coverage of DePauw Announcement 2008
Inauguration

Harvard Graduate School of Arts and Sciences alumni
Living people
Christian Brothers Academy (New Jersey) alumni
People from Monmouth County, New Jersey
Presidents of DePauw University
Presidents of Colgate University
Stanford University alumni
Notre Dame College of Arts and Letters alumni
Year of birth missing (living people)
Davis Polk & Wardwell lawyers